Hot Swing Trio: Live in New York is the third and final album by Mark O'Connor's Hot Swing Trio. It was recorded during live performances in Merkin Hall in New York City on September 21 and 22, 2004. The seventh track, "Fiddler Goin' Home", was written in memory of Claude "Fiddler" Williams, who died in 2004.

Track listing
All tracks not written by O'Connor were arranged by him.
"Fascinating Rhythm" (George Gershwin) – 5:30
"Cherokee" (Ray Noble) – 5:10
"Anniversary" (O'Connor) – 11:16
"Ain't Misbehavin'" (Harry Brooks, Fats Waller) – 8:04
"M&W Rag" (O'Connor) – 5:11
"Funky Swing" (O'Connor) – 6:31
"Fiddler Going Home" (O'Connor) – 4:24
"Gypsy Fantastic" (O'Connor) – 5:21
"Don't Get Around Much Anymore" (Duke Ellington) – 3:07
"Tiger Rag" (traditional) – 5:12

Personnel
Mark O'Connor – violin
Frank Vignola – guitar
Jon Burr – bass

References

Mark O'Connor albums
2005 live albums